Diuris secundiflora, commonly known as the one-sided donkey orchid, is a poorly-known species of orchid that is endemic to New South Wales. It has a single grass-like leaf and up to eight yellow flowers that are sometimes spotted and are all arranged on one side of the flowering stem.

Description
Flowering occurs in October and November.

Taxonomy and naming
Diuris secundiflora was first formally described in 1878 by Robert FitzGerald and the description was published in his book Australian Orchids.

Distribution
The one-sided donkey orchid is only known from the type location near the Macleay River "growing in a small cluster on an open bank".

References

secundiflora
Endemic orchids of Australia
Orchids of New South Wales
Plants described in 1878